James DeHart (August 25, 1893 – March 4, 1935) was an American football player and coach. He served as the head coach at Washington and Lee University from 1922 to 1925 and again from 1931 to 1932 and at Duke University from 1926 to 1930, compiling a career college football record of 51–50–6. In 1935, he signed a contract to become the head coach at Southwestern University—now known as Rhodes College—in Memphis, Tennessee, but fell ill and died while relocating. DeHart attended the University of Pittsburgh, where he played football for the Panthers from 1914 to 1916 and in 1918.  Hailed as a "star", he played quarterback under head coach Pop Warner and led the 1916 team to an undefeated season. He also earned letters in basketball, baseball, and track at Pittsburgh. DeHart put his college education on hiatus to serve in the United States Army during World War I. As a lieutenant in the Aviation Section, he coached a service team at Mather Field. He returned to Pittsburgh after his time in the Army. After graduation, he coached the backfield at the University of Georgia from 1920 to 1921.

Head coaching record

See also
 List of college football head coaches with non-consecutive tenure

References

External links
 

1893 births
1935 deaths
American football quarterbacks
Duke Blue Devils football coaches
Georgia Bulldogs football coaches
Pittsburgh Panthers baseball players
Pittsburgh Panthers football players
Pittsburgh Panthers men's basketball players
Pittsburgh Panthers men's track and field athletes
Washington and Lee Generals football coaches
United States Army personnel of World War I
United States Army officers
People from Jefferson County, Pennsylvania
Players of American football from Pennsylvania